Arthur L. Herring (March 10, 1906 – December 2, 1995) born in Altus, Oklahoma, was a pitcher for the Detroit Tigers (1929–33), Brooklyn Dodgers (1934 and 1944–47), Chicago White Sox (1939) and Pittsburgh Pirates (1947).

Herring led the American League in hit batsmen (8) in 1931.

In 11 seasons, Herring had a 34–38 win–loss record, 199 games pitched (56 started), 25 complete games, 3 shutouts, 80 games finished, 13 saves, 697 innings pitched, 754 hits allowed, 401 runs allowed, 335 earned runs allowed, 40 home runs allowed, 284 walks allowed, 243 strikeouts, 20 hit batsmen, 7 wild pitches, 3,097 batters faced and a 4.32 ERA.

Herring died in Marion, Indiana at the age of 89.

References

External links

1906 births
1995 deaths
People from Altus, Oklahoma
Baseball players from Oklahoma
Major League Baseball pitchers
Detroit Tigers players
Brooklyn Dodgers players
Chicago White Sox players
Pittsburgh Pirates players
People from Marion, Indiana
Beaumont Exporters players
Toronto Maple Leafs (International League) players
Albany Senators players
Sacramento Senators players
St. Paul Saints (AA) players
Columbus Red Birds players